A Local Notice to Mariners is an authoritative instruction issued by a designated official, typically the harbormaster.

United States

In the United States, notices are issued by each U.S. Coast Guard District to disseminate important information affecting navigational safety within that District. This Notice reports changes and deficiencies in aids to navigation maintained by the Coast Guard. Other marine information such as new charts, channel depths, naval operations, and regattas is included. Since temporary information of short duration is not included in the weekly Notice to Mariners, the Local Notice to Mariners may be the only source of such information. Small craft using the Intracoastal Waterway and small harbors not normally used by oceangoing vessels need it to keep charts and publications up-to-date.

Since correcting information for U.S. charts in the Notice to Mariners is obtained from the Coast Guard Local Notices, it is normal to expect a lag of 1 or 2 weeks for the Notice to Mariners to publish a correction from this source.

The Local Notice to Mariners may be obtained free of charge by contacting the appropriate Coast Guard District Commander. Vessels operating in ports and waterways in several districts must obtain the Local Notice to Mariners from each district.

Sources
The text of the US material originated from section 422 of The American Practical Navigator, a document produced by the government of the United States of America.

Examples
LNTMs are, by definition, concerned with local issues. Each issuing authority has its own series of LNTMs – there is no international standard numbering or indexing scheme. Individual LNTMs may concern short or long term situations. At Portsmouth, mariners are instructed by LNTM 28/07 to keep clear of warship berths. At Holyhead, LNTM 5/2008 concerns Bunkering or transferring oil in port. At Chichester, No 16 of 2008 Sea defence works at Hayling Island gives timely information about dredging operations.

See also
American Practical Navigator
Buoy
Coast Pilots
List of Lights
Notice to Mariners
Sailing Directions

External links
 Chapter 4: Nautical Publications - from the online edition of Nathaniel Bowditch's American Practical Navigator
 Local Notices to Mariners online

Navigation
Hydrography
Sailing books